Langeloth is a census-designated place in Smith Township, Washington County, Pennsylvania. Langeloth has been assigned the ZIP code 15054.  As of the 2010 census, the population was 717 residents.

Langeloth began as a coal mining company town. Langeloth Metallurgical Company, now a unit of Centerra Gold, is the town's largest employer. It was the birthplace of noted former college football coach Barry Alvarez.

References

Census-designated places in Pennsylvania
Census-designated places in Washington County, Pennsylvania
Company towns in Pennsylvania